(archaic , Transylvanian Saxon:) is the capital city of Bistrița-Năsăud County, in northern Transylvania, Romania. It is situated on the Bistrița River.

Etymology
The town was named after the  River, whose name comes from the Slavic word  meaning 'fast-moving water'.

History
The Turkic Pechenegs settled the area in 12th century following attacks of the Cumans. Transylvanian Saxons settled the area in 1206 and called the region . A large part of settlers were fugitives, convicts, and poor people looking for lands and opportunities. The city was then called . Situated on several trade routes,  became a flourishing medieval trading post.

 became a free royal town in 1330. In 1353, King Louis I of Hungary granted the town the right to organize an annual 15-day fair on Saint Bartholomew day, as well as a seal containing the coat of arms of an ostrich with a horseshoe in its beak. The town developed markets throughout Moldavia, and its craftsmen travelled extensively. It was given the right to be surrounded by defensive walls in 1409. In 1465, the city's fortifications had 18 defensive towers and bastions defended by the local guilds. In 1713 the Romanian population was expelled by the Saxon magistrates, but they returned later. The town was badly damaged by fire five times between 1836 and 1850. The church suffered from fire in 1857, when the tower's roof and the bells were destroyed. The roof was rebuilt after several years. Fires in the nineteenth century also destroyed much of the city's medieval citadel.

A Jewish community developed in  after the prohibition on Jewish settlement there was lifted in 1848, organizing itself in the 1860s. The synagogue, consecrated in 1893, is among Transylvania's largest and most impressive. The community was Orthodox with a strong Hasidic section, but there were also Jews who adopted German and Hungarian culture. During World War I, 138  Jews were conscripted into the Austro-Hungarian Army; 12 were killed in action.

The city was part of the Austro-Hungarian Empire until 1918. On December 1 that year, Transylvania united with Romania, and Romanian Army troops entered  on December 5. In 1925, Bistrița became the capital of Năsăud County.

World War II
In the wake of the Second Vienna Award (1940), the city reverted to the Kingdom of Hungary. In May 1944, the Jewish population was forced into the Bistrița ghetto, set up at Stamboli Farm, about two miles from the city. The ghetto consisted of a number of barracks and pigsties. At its peak, the ghetto held close to 6,000 Jews, including those brought in from the neighboring communities in Beszterce-Naszód County.

After King Michael's Coup of August 1944, Romania switched sides to the Allies. By October of that year, Romanian and Soviet troops gained control of all of Northern Transylvania, which was reintegrated into Romania in March 1945.

Recent events
On June 11, 2008, the tower and roof of the church caught fire when three children who went to steal copper set it on fire while playing. The main part of the church suffered only slight damage, the interior remaining intact. It is speculated that both of the tower's bells, one dating from the 15th century, the other from the 17th, may have melted in the blaze.

Climate
Due to its modest elevation,  has one of the coldest climates in Romania.

Demographics 

In 1850, of the 5,214 inhabitants, 3,704 were Germans (71%), 1,207 Romanians (23.1%), 176 Roma (3.4%), 90 Hungarians (1.7%) and 37 (0.7%) of other ethnicities.
According to the census of 1910, the town had 13,236 inhabitants of whom 5,835 were German (44%), 4,470 Romanian (33.77%), 2,824 Hungarian (21.33%).

 Romanians: 64,214 (91.09%)
 Hungarians: 4,109 (5.82%)
 Roma: 1,644 (2.33%)
 Germans (Transylvanian Saxons): 304 (0.43%)
 Others: 0.16%

Prior to World War II there was a sizable Jewish community living in the town. In 1891, 718 of the 9,100 inhabitants (8%) were Jews; in 1900 (11%) and 2,198 (16%) in 1930. In 1941 there are 2,358 (14%). Given continuing discrimination and unfavorable political conditions, the Jewish population declined steadily as a result of emigration to Israel, the United States, and Canada. By 2002, only about 15 Jews lived in the city.

Main sights

 The main attraction of 's central square is the Lutheran church, which was built by the Transylvanian Saxons and originally constructed in the 14th century in Gothic style. Between 1559 and 1563 it was altered by Petrus Italus and given Renaissance features. It was significantly renovated after the 2008 fire which damaged the tower.
Built between 1270 and 1280, the building has undergone several repairs and alterations, the first one being recorded in 1494. After 1541, when the Minorite order left the town, it served as a barn and wine cellar. In 1895, the Romanian Greek Catholic Church purchased the building for 35,000 florins. The church was turned into an Orthodox church in 1948, when the communist government dissolved the Romanian Greek Catholic Church and transferred its properties to the Romanian Orthodox Church, and was decorated in Neo-Byzantine style in 1978–1980.
 The  County Museum, located in a former barracks, contains Thracian, Celtic, and German artifacts.
 The buildings of the city's two leading high schools, Andrei Mureșanu National College and Liviu Rebreanu National College.

Popular culture

In the PlayStation 2 game Shadow Hearts,  (where it is spelled "Biztritz") was a major place and home to the role-playing character Keith Valentine.

Transportation
The major cities directly linked by trains to this city are Bucharest via a night train, and  via several trains.

Tourism
 Arcalia Dendrological Park ( from ), hosts over 150 species of trees (such as Japanese acacia, silver fir trees, Caucasian Spruce fir, etc.); it exists in the land belonging to Babeș-Bolyai University
 Colibița Lake (artificial dam, situated in the Bârgău Mountains)

Natural reservations
  – "Raven's Rock", a geological and vegetal park, situated in the Călimani Mountains
 The Salt Mount in 
 Tăușoare Cave, the deepest cave in Romania –

Resorts
  (balneo – climatic resort, situated in the Rodna Mountains, approx.  from )
  (approx.  from )
  – Wine Valley – (approx.  from )

Museums and exhibitions
 Transylvanian Saxons' Museum – Livezile
 Museum of Contemporary Art – 
 Andrei Mureșanu Memorial House – 
 Liviu Rebreanu Memorial House – Liviu Rebreanu village
 Silversmith's House – 
 George Coșbuc Memorial House – Coșbuc village
 Ion-Pop Reteganul Memorial House – Reteag village

Notable people 
Gavril Bănulescu-Bodoni (1746–1821), bishop
Maria Bosi, handball player
Adrian Crișan, table tennis player 
Count Maximilian von Götzen-Iturbide, heir to the throne of Mexico
Arnold Graffi (1910–2006), doctor
Anita Hartig (born 1983), operatic soprano
Kalinikos Kreanga, table tennis player
Viorel Moldovan, football player and coach
Valeria Motogna-Beșe, handball player
Andrei Mureșanu (1816–1863), writer of the Romanian national anthem
Radu Negulescu (born 1939), table tennis player
Remus Nicolai, aerobic gymnast
Max Speter(1883–1942), German chemist and science historian
Daniel Suciu (born 1980), politician
Gabriela Szabo (born 1975), track and field athlete

Sport

Teams
 CS Gloria 2018 Bistrița-Năsăud playing in Romania's Liga Națională (women's handball), Romanian Handball Federation
 CS Gloria Bistrița-Năsăud, the city's most important team both historically and valuably, currently inactive, commonly known as Gloria is a Romanian football club based Bistrita,Bistrița-Năsăud County, currently playing in the Liga III.

International relations

Twin towns and sister cities 

Bistrița is twinned with:

References

External links 

 Info Bistrița
 History of Bistrița
 ArtGallery Bistrița
 BistrițaOnline.ro
 

 
Populated places in Bistrița-Năsăud County
Localities in Transylvania
Cities in Romania
Capitals of Romanian counties
Place names of Slavic origin in Romania